Trechus lallemantii is a species of ground beetle in the subfamily Trechinae. It was described by Fairmaire in 1859.

References

lallemantii
Beetles described in 1859